Milan Spremo (born 27 April 1995) is a Serbian professional footballer who plays for Polish club ŁKS Łódź.

Career
Spremo made his professional debut for Vojvodina, under coach Dejan Vukićević. On 7 April 2012 he played 45 minutes in 2–0 home loss against Rad.

References

External links
 
 NZS profile 

1995 births
Living people
Serbian footballers
Association football midfielders
Serbia youth international footballers
FK Vojvodina players
FK Sloga Petrovac na Mlavi players
FK Proleter Novi Sad players
NK Celje players
FK Javor Ivanjica players
OFK Bačka players
FK Napredak Kruševac players
FK Borac Banja Luka players
ŁKS Łódź players
Serbian SuperLiga players
Serbian First League players
Uzbekistan Super League players
Slovenian PrvaLiga players

Serbian expatriate footballers
Serbian expatriate sportspeople in Slovenia
Expatriate footballers in Slovenia
Serbian expatriate sportspeople in Uzbekistan
Expatriate footballers in Uzbekistan
Serbian expatriate sportspeople in Bosnia and Herzegovina
Expatriate footballers in Bosnia and Herzegovina
Serbian expatriate sportspeople in Poland
Expatriate footballers in Poland